The 1966–67 Dayton Flyers men's basketball team represented the University of Dayton during the 1966–67 NCAA University Division men's basketball season. The Flyers, led by head coach Don Donoher, played their home games at the University of Dayton Arena and were an NCAA independent. Dayton received a bid to the NCAA tournament as a participant in the Mideast region where they made a run to the national championship game. They beat No. 4 North Carolina in the national semifinal, 76–62, before falling to unbeaten No. 1 UCLA and sophomore phenom Lew Alcindor, 79–64. Dayton finished the season 25–6.

Roster

Schedule and results

|-
!colspan=9 style=| Regular season

|-
!colspan=9 style=| NCAA Tournament

Rankings

References

Dayton Flyers men's basketball seasons
Dayton
Dayton
NCAA Division I men's basketball tournament Final Four seasons
Dayton
Dayton